Lecithocera palingensis is a moth in the family Lecithoceridae first described by Kyu-Tek Park in 1999. It is found in Taiwan.

The wingspan is 13–16 mm. The forewings' ground color is orange white, with dark-brown scales scattered sparsely throughout. There are two well defined dark discal spots, the inner one is almost the same size as the distal one. The hindwings are pale grey.

Etymology
The species name is derived from the type locality, Paling.

References

Moths described in 1999
palingensis